The Golden Head is a 1964 American-Hungarian comedy film directed by Richard Thorpe and James Hill and starring George Sanders, Buddy Hackett, Jess Conrad, Lorraine Power and Robert Coote.

Plot
The children of a British policeman holidaying in Hungary track down a priceless art treasure which has recently been stolen.

Cast
 George Sanders as Basil Palmer
 Buddy Hackett as Lionel Pack
 Jess Conrad as Michael Stevenson
 Lorraine Power as Milly Stevenson
 Robert Coote as Braithwaite
 Denis Gilmore as Harold Stevenson
 Cecília Esztergályos as Anne
 Douglas Wilmer as Detective Inspector Stevenson
 Sándor Pécsi as Priest
 Zoltán Makláry as Old Man

Production
Its Hungarian title is Az aranyfej. It was shot on location in Hungary in the Super Technirama 70 process, and was loosely based on the novel Nepomuk of the River by Roger Windle Pilkington. Lionel Jeffries and Hayley Mills were originally attached to the project. James Hill was the original director, but was replaced by Richard Thorpe during shooting.

Home media
The Golden Head was released in 2019 by Flicker Alley in a Region 1/A dual DVD/Blu-ray edition. It is presented in "Smilebox" format, simulating the original cinema showings on wide Cinerama screens.

References

External links

1964 films
1964 comedy films
1960s multilingual films
1960s English-language films
1960s Hungarian-language films
Films directed by James Hill (British director)
Metro-Goldwyn-Mayer films
Films directed by Richard Thorpe
Films shot in Budapest
Films shot in Hungary
Hungarian comedy films
American comedy films
Hungarian multilingual films
American multilingual films
1960s American films